Erigeron elatior is a North American species of flowering plants in the family Asteraceae known by the common name tall fleabane.

Erigeron elatior is native to the western United States, in the states of New Mexico, Colorado, Utah, and Wyoming. It grows in subalpine brush, mountain meadows, and openings in coniferous forests.

Erigeron elatior is a perennial herb up to 60 centimeters (2 feet) in height, spreading buy means of woody underground rhizomes. It produces 1-6 flower heads per stem, each head with 75–150 pink or rose-purple ray florets surrounding numerous yellow disc florets.

References

elatior
Flora of the Western United States
Plants described in 1862
Flora without expected TNC conservation status